The national flag of the Principality of Monaco has two equal horizontal bands, of red (top) and white (bottom), both of which have been the heraldic colours of the House of Grimaldi since at least 1339. The present bicolour design was adopted on 4 April 1881, under Charles III.

Overview
Monaco's original flag, which was similar to its current princely flag but bore an older version of its coat of arms, was in use from the principality's early days (except during its annexation to France from 1793 to 1814) until the present, simpler design was adopted in 1881.

Another design (below), the banner of the state arms (lozenges in the Grimaldi family colours, in heraldic terms "lozengy argent and gules"), was used at various times, particularly in the 17th century, as an unofficial flag and still appears in some royal photographs. However, it has no designated use and does not represent any Monegasque official in particular.

The flag of Monaco is graphically similar to the flag of Indonesia, with differences in their dimension ratios (Monaco's at 4:5 and Indonesia's at 2:3), and the shade of red is darker for the flag of Monaco. The flag of Poland is also similar to that of Monaco, but with the colours reversed – white on top and red on the bottom. The flag of Singapore also has a similar design and colour, with the exception being a crescent with the five stars pointed at the upper left side.

Princely flag
Monaco's princely flag (or government flag) consists of the full achievement of the coat of arms on a white background. It is flown at the Prince's palace, government offices, in the presence of government officials, and as an ensign on the Prince's yacht.

Personal standard of Albert II

The personal standard of Prince Albert II consists of the Crown of Monaco over two opposing letters A, on a white background. It is only used in his immediate presence, particularly on cars in which he travels. It is often seen with a gold fringe on the top, bottom and right, which is one-ninth the height of the white field.

See also
List of Monaco flags

Notes
 Sources disagree as to the flag's usage.

References

External links

 
 Drapeau monégasque — Gouvernement de Monaco 

1881 introductions
1881 establishments in Monaco
National symbols of Monaco
Monaco
Monaco